Anthony Robert Staynings (born 21 July 1953) is a male retired British middle-distance runner. Staynings competed in the 3000 metres steeplechase at the 1976 Summer Olympics and the 1980 Summer Olympics. He represented England in the 3,000 metres steeplechase event, at the 1978 Commonwealth Games in Edmonton, Alberta, Canada. He was also the winner of the 1980 UK Athletics Championships title.

References

1953 births
Living people
Athletes (track and field) at the 1976 Summer Olympics
Athletes (track and field) at the 1978 Commonwealth Games
Athletes (track and field) at the 1980 Summer Olympics
British male middle-distance runners
British male steeplechase runners
Olympic athletes of Great Britain
Sportspeople from Hanover
Commonwealth Games competitors for England